The Mist in the Mirror: A Ghost Story is a novel by Susan Hill. The novel is about a traveller called Sir James Monmouth and his pursuit of an explorer called Conrad Vane.

Summary
Sir James Monmouth has spent most of his life travelling. After the death of his parents, he was raised by his guardian. Later, he arrives in England with the intention of discovering more about himself and his obsession with explorer Conrad Vane. Warned against following his trail, Sir James experiences some extraordinary happenings – who is the mysterious, sad little boy, and the old woman behind the curtain? And why is it that only he hears the chilling scream and the desperate sobbing?

Reception
A 2014 book review by Kirkus Reviews called the novel "a glacially paced adventure" and concluded; "The eponymous mist seems to cloud the writing, and the meandering tale ends quickly with a conclusion that still seems obscure."

References

Novels by Susan Hill
Ghost novels
1992 British novels
Sinclair-Stevenson books